Suzanne Segal (1955–1997) was a writer and teacher about spiritual enlightenment, known for her sudden experience of self-realization which she wrote about in her book Collision With the Infinite: A Life Beyond the Personal Self.

In addition to gaining note in the spiritual community, Segal became a model case of the dissociative condition known as depersonalization disorder (DPD).  Along her journey some therapists formally diagnosed her with DPD, while others did not have clear explanations.

In 1997, Segal's health began rapidly deteriorating, and she was diagnosed with a malignant brain tumor.  She died two months later that year, leaving many questions about the root cause of her experience unanswered.

Early life
Segal's childhood was filled with attempts to evoke a state of psychological detachment from her identity.  She experienced moments which she described as "vastness" after repeating her name as a mantra. She started studying Transcendental Meditation and found the experience similarly awakening, but left the organization when she began to dislike the rigidity of the format.  Segal moved to California and received a degree in English from the UC Berkeley.  She then moved to Paris, where she had a daughter, and where her marked depersonalization experience began. In the fall of 1986 she enrolled in the John F. Kennedy University in their clinical psychology masters program transferring to the Wright Institute's PhD program in the fall of 1987.  She completed her dissertation and received her doctorate in Psychology in 1991.

Enlightenment experience
One day in 1982, while boarding a bus in Paris, the 27-year-old Segal experienced a sudden shift in her consciousness.  She described the experience in her book, Collisions With the Infinite:
"I lifted my right foot to step up into the bus and collided head-on with an invisible force that entered my awareness like a silently exploding stick of dynamite, blowing the door of my usual consciousness open and off its hinges, splitting me in two. In the gaping space that appeared, what I had previously called 'me' was forcefully pushed out of its usual location inside me into a new location that was approximately a foot behind and to the left of my head. 'I' was now behind my body looking out at the world without using the body's eyes."

Segal described this first period of her experience as "witnessing", since she was aware of herself but also critically detached from it.  This was tremendously unpleasant for her, full of anxiety and fear:
The moment the eyes opened the next morning, the mind exploded in worry. Is this insanity? Pscyhosis? Schizophrenia? Is this what people call a nervous breakdown? Depression? What happened? And would it ever stop?... The mind was in agony as it tried valiantly to make sense of something it could never comprehend, and the body responded to the anguish of the mind by locking itself into survival mode, adrenaline pumping, senses fine-tuned, finding and responding to the threat of annihilation in every moment."

Having a background in meditation, Segal questioned whether this break could be the first step in a positive journey but dismissed it:
"The thought did arise that perhaps this experience of witnessing was the state of Cosmic Consciousness Maharishi had described long before as the first stage of awakened awareness. But the mind instantly discarded this possibility because it seemed impossible that the hell realm I was inhabiting could have anything to do with Cosmic Consciousness."

In the years after her break Segal continued to function with seeming normalcy, completing a doctorate in psychology at the Wright Institute.  She continued to feel completely depersonalized, literally as if her own name did not refer to anyone.  She described it as if her "... body, mind, speech, thoughts, and emotions were all empty; they had no ownership, no person behind them. I was utterly bereft of all my previous notions of reality".

Segal's state of mind terrified her, and she sought advice from California's Buddhist community. Buddhism intentionally cultivates loss of ego and a sense of emptiness and oneness, and spiritual teachers tried to help Segal see her condition positively. Several even congratulated her: "This is a wonderful experience. It has to stay eternally with you. This is perfect freedom. You have become (moksha) of the realized sages," read one letter she received.

Twelve years after her initial break, Segal dramatically entered another phase of her experience, centered around a sense of unity of perception between herself and the world:  "In the midst of a particularly eventful week, I was driving north to meet some friends when I suddenly became aware that I was driving through myself.  For years there had been no self at all, yet here on this road everything was myself, and I was driving through me to arrive where I already was.  In essence, I was going nowhere because I was everywhere already.  The infinite emptiness I knew myself to be was now apparent as the infinite substance of everything I saw."  This sense of cognitive and spiritual oneness remained with Segal for two years, up through the publishing of Collisions in 1996.

Spirituality

Analysis
Segal's story also received attention by many writers and publications.  Collisions was reviewed by Yoga Journal magazine in 1997, the reviewer writing, "This frank and engaging account is a fascinating view of the unfolding of a realization without a spiritual practice or intention."

The 2004 book The Biology of Transcendence tried to characterize Segal's state of mind during her second phase of union:  "[It was] fusion with 'the vastness' and her discovery that the vastness perceived its universe through her own sensory system, which was at that point the sensory system of the vastness itself... [she] essentially perceived the universe perceiving itself, but without her, that perception did not exist."

A 2008 graduate dissertation by Arvin Paul used Segal's experience as an example of "Shift/s in the Locus of Identity Upon Initial Awakening", "a shift from the conventional sense of self to the uninvolved witness, and/or allpervasive presence, and/or boundless spaciousness, and/or pure awareness, and/or Being, and/or emptiness/void, and/or the Self, and/or the simple recognition of nonseparateness."  Paul quotes Segal:  "That recognition doesn’t change who you really are, ever. You have always been That. And yes, there is a way that the Vastness Itself can perceive Itself so directly, without any fogging or shadowing or taking anything else to be who you are. I guess you could call it a waking up, but what seems most important to convey is that this is who everyone is all the time whether the direct awareness of it is there or not."

Segal was interviewed for the chapter devoted to her in the 2003 book The Awakening West by Lynn Marie Lumiere and John Lumiere-Wins.

Segal's own teaching
After Segal's second shift she began sharing her insights with the public and with a group of psychologists in a "training group". She says, "I started training groups for therapists because I want this to be conveyed to those who are in the business of trying to help end suffering". She wants people to see "things to be what they are" instead of pathologizing "a broad range of human experience".

Experience with depersonalization disorder

After her initial break, Segal sought to determine what had happened to her and consulted various psychologists and psychiatrists.  Though some had no clear explanation for the experience, one labelled it depersonalization disorder, stating "I don't know what else it could be but symptoms of depersonalization".  Segal went on to read up on depersonalization, derealization, and dissociation, finding some related to her experience but none were a perfect fit and they ultimately failed to capture the sensation of lacking a self in conjunction with normal, or even improved functioning.

Segal's story was profiled in the 2006 book Feeling Unreal: Depersonalization Disorder and the Loss of the Self by Daphne Simeon and Jeffrey Abugel.  It was suggested for a book review in The Journal of the American Psychological Association that rather than representing depersonalization, Segal's experiences may represent a dissociative disorder.

The 2011 book Stranger to My Self: Inside Depersonalization; the Hidden Epidemic by Jeffrey Abugel contextualized Segal's experience as following: "Sometimes, however, even a person well-versed in eastern philosophy may find themselves depersonalized in a way that seems to be anything but part of the road to enlightenment."  Stranger noted that Segal's reportedly sudden depersonalization experience was part of a longer—possibly compulsive—history of searching for and at times experiencing that phenomenon:
As a young girl, Segal would sometimes repeat her own name in her head over and over.  Eventually, "a threshold was crossed and the identity, as that name, broke like a ship released suddenly from its mooring to float untethered on the ocean waves... she felt empty... The person to whom that name referred was probably an illusion, no identity as that name."  Then came fear, eventually followed by a return to normalcy.  But the compulsion to do the same thing once again always returned.  Many people with DPD have cited similar early life incidents.  They may involve repeating words until they lose their meaning, or looking intently in the mirror until an overwhelming sense of strangeness emerges.  Usually these episodes pass, are forgotten, and remain in the realm of youthful mind games.

Yet for Segal, as she became older the episodes became much more prominent rather than less.  Segal's autobiography was completed in 1996 and she had begun giving presentations and leading weekly dialogues as well as a "training group" for therapists.  By late spring Segal began having even more intense experiences in which, "the feeling of emptiness became even worse."  The experiences entranced her but became increasingly disruptive.  By the end of the summer she was exhausted, and doctors encouraged her to rest.  Around the same time, she noticed that the fear from years before had returned.

Suzanne spent that fall at her home in Stinson Beach, California. During this period she recovered memories of childhood abuse.  Spiritual teacher Stephan Bodian, who counseled Segal during that time wrote, "They seemed to explain some of the fear she had experienced during the 10 lonely years of being no one before realizing that she was everything. When I suggested that perhaps the fear originated from a part of herself that was split off or dissociated from conscious awareness, she immediately agreed."

Stranger documented this period as a retreat from the earlier spiritual themes that had defined her experience.  "As a psychologist, she was well tutored in a possible ramification of childhood abuse—dissociation.  Once again, Segal began to perceive things differently, this time from the psychological viewpoint rather than that of transcendent spirituality."

Death
Segal did not have time to discover what the source of her dramatic shifts in perception had been.  By February 1997, at the age of 42, her physical and mental capabilities began to quickly decline.  She entered the hospital on February 27, and doctors discovered a malignant brain tumor, having surgery but refusing chemotherapy or radiation.

On March 10 she married her fiancé Steve Kruszynski.  After the wedding they traveled to Oklahoma to seek out alternative treatments, but Segal's debilitation returned during the trip and they had to return home, and she entered a coma several days later.

She died on the morning of Tuesday, April 1.  Bodian described her funeral: Following a Tibetan custom, the body was wrapped in a cloth, surrounded by flowers, and left untouched for three days. On the third day we sat with her body as a local rabbi performed a traditional Jewish ceremony at her mother's request.The following Saturday, nearly 100 people gathered to celebrate her life, appreciate her gifts to us, and share our grief. At sunset, her husband, Steve, her fourteen-year-old daughter, Arielle, and her brother Bob waded out into the cold spring surf and scattered her ashes into the sky. 
 

Members of the spiritual and psychological community went on to debate the significance of her experience.  In the afterword to the 1998 edition of Collisions, Bodian gave his personal opinion, "Those of us who were close to Suzanne never doubted the depth or the authenticity of her realization."

See also
Ramana Maharshi
Papaji
Gangaji
Jean Klein
Andrew Cohen
Christopher Titmuss
Reb Anderson

Footnotes

References

External links
 Interview at spiritualteachers.org
 Tomas Rocha (2014), The Dark Knight of the Soul, The Atlantic
 Shinzen Young (2011), The Dark Night
 Brad Warner (2014), Zen Freak Outs!
 Smiling Buddha Cabaret (2009), Depersonalization vs Enlightenment 

20th-century American psychologists
American women psychologists
20th-century American non-fiction writers
20th-century American women writers
American spiritual writers
New Age writers
Women mystics
New Age spiritual leaders
Wright Institute alumni
1955 births
1997 deaths
American women non-fiction writers